Anadia escalerae is a species of lizard in the family Gymnophthalmidae. It is known from the holotype collected from the La Escalera region in Venezuela and another specimen from the Pacaraima Mountains in Guyana.

References

Anadia (genus)
Reptiles of Guyana
Reptiles of Venezuela
Reptiles described in 2009
Taxa named by Robert C. Jadin
Taxa named by Charles W. Myers
Taxa named by Gilson Rivas